The C&C 29 is a Canadian sailboat, that was designed by Cuthbertson & Cassian as an International Offshore Rule Half Ton class racer-cruiser and first built in 1977.

The design was likely derived from the C&C 1/2 Ton of 1975.

The boat was originally marketed by the manufacturer as the C&C 29, but is now sometimes referred to as the C&C 29-1 or C&C 29 Mark I, to differentiate it from the unrelated 1983 C&C 29-2 design which was also sold under the name C&C 29.

Production
The boat was built by C&C Yachts in Canada, between 1977 and 1981, with some built in the US as well at their Rhode Island plant. Over 600 boats were completed, but the design is now out of production.

Design

The C&C 29 is a racing keelboat, built predominantly of fibreglass, with wood trim. It has a masthead sloop rig, an internally-mounted spade-type rudder and a fixed fin keel or shoal draft keel.

The design has sleeping accommodation for six people, with a double "V"-berth in the bow cabin, two straight settee berths in the main cabin and an aft cabin with a double berth on the port side. The galley is located on the starboard side just forward of the companionway ladder. The galley is "L"-shaped and is equipped with a three-burner stove, ice box and a sink. A navigation station is opposite the galley, on the port side. The head is located just aft of the bow cabin.

The boat has a PHRF racing average handicap of 177 with a high of 191 and low of 172.

Operational history
In a 2004 in Practical Sailor review Darrell Nicholson quoted C&C sales manager Hank Evans, who said, "while the 29 was a great success (over 600 sold) with many one- design fleets, and is a pretty good-looking boat, it left a lot to be desired from a design standpoint. It was very fast and nicely balanced in light and moderate air, but the only way to sail her in a breeze is to ease the traveler all the way down and carry the main almost fully aback. Racer/cruisers are not generally intended to be sailed like dinghies."

See also

List of sailing boat types

Related development
C&C 1/2 Ton
C&C 29-2

Similar sailboats
Alberg 29
Bayfield 29 
Cal 29
Hunter 290
Island Packet 29
Mirage 29
Northwind 29
Prospect 900
Tanzer 29
Thames Marine Mirage 29
Watkins 29

References

External links

Keelboats
1970s sailboat type designs
Sailing yachts
Sailboat type designs by C&C Design
Sailboat types built by C&C Yachts